Peter Runge, known by his recording alias Sd Laika, is an electronic recording artist from Milwaukee, Wisconsin, United States. He released his first work, the Unknown Vectors EP in 2012 via Lost Codes. This was the first release for the London-based label founded by grime producer Visionist.

He was later approached by Robin Carolan to release a full album through his UK/US label Tri Angle, which resulted in Runge gathering tracks mainly created during 2011 to 2012 to form his 2014 debut album That's Harakiri. This release gained him a wider audience including reviews from Pitchfork, Resident Advisor, and The Quietus. This album covered many different genres, but was described variously as experimental grime and bass music. Dummy magazine named it their album of the week. In a rare interview later that year, highly influential electronic producer Aphex Twin named Sd Laika as one of the newer artists he listened to most.

His work was sampled by Aphex Twin on his tour in 2017, by Björk in her November 2017 mix for Mixmag, and by Manchester producer Acre in his mix for Fact in January 2018.

Discography
36 (Single) (2012)

Unknown Vectors (EP) (2012)

Idiot Thug (Mix) (2014)

That's Harakiri (Album) (2014)

Reckless (Single) (2014)

Sanpaku Island (Single) (2015)

Mostly Trash (EP) (2015)

Dreadful John (EP) (2015)

Latent Fish (Single) (2018)

References

External links

Living people
Year of birth missing (living people)
American electronic musicians
Musicians from Wisconsin
American experimental musicians
Grime music artists